Boricua's Bond is a 2000 American drama film written and directed by Val Lik. The film stars Frankie Negrón, Val Lik, Ramses Ignacio, Jorge Gautier, Jesglar Cabral and Robyn Karp. The film was released on June 21, 2000, by USA Films.

Plot
Allen, a white kid, moves into a South Bronx neighborhood with his single mom, and is a victim of constant harassment until Tommy, a local kid, offers friendship. A corrupt cop hits on Allen's mother and, when she rebuffs him, he seeks revenge. Forces beyond Allen and Tommy's control put them in the hands of the criminal justice system and make things even more difficult for the dreams of the young men.

Cast 
Frankie Negrón as Tommy
Val Lik as Allen
Ramses Ignacio as Axel
Jorge Gautier as Wilson
Jesglar Cabral as Antonio
Robyn Karp as Susan Miller
Geovanny Pineda as Avery
Marco Sorisio as Officer Highlander
Erica Torres as Christine
Kaleena Justiniano as Rose 
Jeff Knite as Paco
Michael '2-Smoove' Demitro as Sammy
Pietro González as Diner Owner
Manuel Cabral as Tommy's Father
Elsa Canals as Tommy's Mother
Maurice Phillips as Santa
Edison Torres as Priest
Vanessa Del Sol as Princess
Jack 'JDS' Da Silva as Blinky
Footprintz as Seta
Paul Manion as Detective Chroney
Sticky Fingaz as Tyler

References

External links
 
 

2000 films
American drama films
Hood films
2000 drama films
Films set in the Bronx
2000s English-language films
2000s American films